Nicholas Clayton Mullens (born March 21, 1995) is an American football quarterback for the Minnesota Vikings of the National Football League (NFL). He played college football at Southern Miss, where he surpassed Brett Favre's single-season record for passing yardage (4,476) and touchdown passes (38).

Early life
Mullens was born to Suzanne and Mark Mullens on March 21, 1995, in Little Rock, Arkansas and grew up in Hoover, Alabama, a suburb of Birmingham. He is the grandson of Ernie Tabor, who pitched in the Philadelphia Phillies minor league system in the 1950s. His uncle, Scott Tabor, pitched for the Arkansas Razorbacks baseball team, and holds the school record for most career wins. He also pitched professionally in the minor leagues. Mullens graduated from Spain Park High School in Hoover.

High school career
Mullens played football for Spain Park, emerging as the team's starting quarterback. During his senior season, 2012, Mullens threw for 3,649 yards and 40 touchdowns, against only seven interceptions, en route to winning the 2012 Gatorade Player of the Year award for the state of Alabama. He had totaled 8,605 career passing yards, finishing his high school career with the 7th most passing yards in AHSAA history, to go along with 40 passing touchdowns.

After originally verbally committing to attend the University of Alabama at Birmingham, Mullens changed course on national signing day following a last-minute visit to the University of Southern Mississippi, signing instead with the Golden Eagles.

College career
After starting the 2013 season with a 0–6 record, in an 18-game losing streak, Southern Miss head coach Todd Monken inserted true freshman Mullens as a starter for game seven, a home game against the North Texas Mean Green. The young team was overmatched by North Texas, however, suffering a 55–14 loss in which Mullens went 12-for-31 passing for 210 yards and one touchdown, while suffering three interceptions and a lost fumble.

In his second collegiate game, a loss to Marshall, Mullens became the first true freshman starting quarterback in Southern Miss history to pass for more than 300 yards in a single game, a feat never accomplished during his freshman year by the school's most famous football alumnus, Brett Favre.

On November 30, 2013, Mullens played a key role in helping Southern Miss end its losing streak at 23 games with a five-touchdown performance against the University of Alabama-Birmingham, which also happened to be the college that he originally committed to.

Mullens passed for 1,776 yards as a freshman in 2013. As a sophomore in 2014, he started 10 games and completed 218 of 365 attempts for 2,470 passing yards and 12 touchdowns.

In the 2015 regular season, Mullens completed 331 of 521 passes (63.5%) for 4,476 yards and 38 touchdowns – school records for passing yardage and touchdown passes. He ranked sixth among NCAA Division I FBS quarterbacks in passing yardage. Mullens' efforts were instrumental in a reversal of fortunes of the Southern Miss football program, with the team posting a 9–5 record for the year just two seasons after snapping its abysmal 23-game losing streak. He started all 14 games as the Golden Eagles finished with more than 7,000 yards of offense for the first time in school history.

In 2016, Mullens made 11 starts and completed 243 of 384 attempts for 3,272 yards and 24 touchdowns, averaging 297.5 passing yards per game. On October 1, 2016, against the Rice Owls, he threw for a collegiate career-high 591 yards, four touchdowns, and one interception in the 44–28 victory.

In four seasons at Southern Miss (2013–2016), Mullens played in 44 games (41 starts) and completed 928 of 1,546 attempts for 11,994 yards and 87 touchdowns. He finished his collegiate career as the career passing leader in every statistical category. His 11,994 yards passing and 87 touchdown passes dwarfed the 7,695 yards and 52 touchdowns registered by former NFL great Brett Favre during his four years with the Golden Eagles.

Statistics

Professional career

San Francisco 49ers

2017 season

On May 4, 2017, Mullens signed with the San Francisco 49ers as an undrafted free agent. He entered training camp as the fourth backup quarterback on the depth chart behind veterans Brian Hoyer and Matt Barkley, and rookie C. J. Beathard.

On September 2, 2017, Mullens was waived as part of the 49ers' final roster cuts, but he was signed to the practice squad the next day. On January 2, 2018, the 49ers signed Mullens to a reserve/futures contract after he spent his entire rookie season on the practice squad.

2018 season

On September 1, 2018, Mullens was waived by the 49ers and was signed to the practice squad the next day. On September 26, 2018, the 49ers promoted Mullens to their active roster after starting quarterback Jimmy Garoppolo tore his ACL and was placed on injured reserve for the rest of the season. The terms of his new contract were for two years and $1.05 million.

On November 1, 2018, Mullens was named the starter for the 49ers' Week 9 game against the Oakland Raiders on Thursday Night Football after Beathard suffered a wrist injury in the previous game against the Arizona Cardinals. Mullens finished his NFL debut and first NFL start completing 16 of 22 pass attempts for 262 yards and three touchdowns as the 49ers won 34–3. His passer rating of 151.9 was the highest since 1970 for a quarterback with at least 20 passing attempts in a debut. Mullens was also the first player in 49ers history to throw three touchdowns in his first game for the team. He completed a 24-yard touchdown pass to wide receiver Pierre Garçon in the first quarter to mark his first NFL touchdown. The following week against the New York Giants, Mullens threw for 250 yards, one touchdown, and was intercepted twice by linebacker B.J. Goodson as the 49ers lost by a score of 27–23 on Monday Night Football. Mullens made his first road start during Week 12. Facing the Tampa Bay Buccaneers, he threw for 221 yards, one touchdown, and two interceptions as the 49ers lost by a score of 27–9. During Week 13 against the Seattle Seahawks, Mullens finished with a career-high 414 passing yards, two touchdowns, and an interception as the 49ers lost by a score of 43–16. In Week 14 against the Denver Broncos, he passed for 332 yards, two touchdowns, and an interception as the 49ers won by a score of 20–14. In Week 15, Mullens threw for 275 yards and a touchdown to help the 49ers defeat the Seattle Seahawks in overtime by a score of 26–23, marking the first time the 49ers beat the Seahawks since 2013. In the regular-season finale against the Los Angeles Rams, he finished with 282 passing yards, three touchdowns, and three interceptions in the 48–32 loss.

Mullens finished the 2018 season with 2,277 passing yards, 13 touchdowns, and ten interceptions.

2019 season

During the 2019 season, Mullens primarily served as the backup to Jimmy Garoppolo. He only appeared in one game in the 2019 season. The 49ers reached Super Bowl LIV, but the team lost 31–20 to the Kansas City Chiefs.

2020 season

On March 5, 2020, Mullens was assigned a one-year, $750,000 exclusive-rights free agent tender by the 49ers. He signed the contract on May 1, 2020. On September 20, 2020, in a game against the New York Jets, Mullens came in after halftime after Jimmy Garoppolo suffered a leg injury. In the game, Mullens completed 8 of 11 passes for 71 yards and an interception in a 31–13 victory. Mullens was named the starter for Week 3 against the New York Giants. In the 36–9 victory, he passed for 343 yards and one touchdown.  In Week 4 against the Philadelphia Eagles, Mullens posted a career low passer rating of 72.6 in which he threw a pick six to linebacker Alex Singleton, thus resulting in Mullens getting benched for C. J. Beathard. Without Mullens, the 49ers would lose 25–20 to the Eagles. 

In Week 8 against the Seattle Seahawks, Mullens came into the game in the fourth quarter after Jimmy Garoppolo left the game with an ankle injury. Mullens rallied the 49ers back in the game by completing 18 of 25 passes for 238 yards and two touchdowns but the 49ers lost 27–37. Mullens was named the starter for the 49ers again for the 49ers' Thursday Night Football game against the Green Bay Packers due to Garoppolo being sidelined indefinitely due to his ankle injury. In Week 13, against the Buffalo Bills, he had 316 passing yards, three touchdowns, and two interceptions in the 34–24 loss.

On December 22, 2020, it was announced that Mullens would miss the rest of the season with an elbow injury he suffered in the 49ers 41–33 loss against the Dallas Cowboys. He was placed on injured reserve three days later. Mullens was scheduled to become a restricted free agent following the season, but the team did not extend a tender to him at the start of the new league year and he became an unrestricted free agent.

Philadelphia Eagles
On June 14, 2021, Mullens signed a one-year contract with the Philadelphia Eagles. On August 28, 2021, Mullens was waived by the Eagles.

Cleveland Browns
Mullens was signed to the Cleveland Browns' practice squad on September 1, 2021. Mullens was elevated to the Browns' active roster on October 21, 2021, prior to their game that evening, and reverted to the practice squad the following day. 

For the Week 15 matchup against the Las Vegas Raiders, Mullens was named the starting quarterback after the Browns experienced a COVID-19 outbreak, which included fellow quarterbacks Baker Mayfield and Case Keenum testing positive. In addition, the game was moved from Saturday, December 18, to Monday, December 20, the first game of the season to be postponed due to COVID-19. During the game, Mullens threw a touchdown pass late in the fourth quarter, giving the Browns the lead. Derek Carr subsequently led a successful drive down the field, which ended with the Raiders kicking a field goal and winning 16–14. Mullens completed 20 of 30 passes for 147 yards and a touchdown in the loss before reverting back to the practice squad later that week.

Las Vegas Raiders
Mullens signed with the Las Vegas Raiders on April 4, 2022.

Minnesota Vikings
On August 22, 2022, the Raiders traded Mullens to the Minnesota Vikings for a 2024 conditional seventh-round pick.

On March 14, 2023, Mullens signed a two-year contract extension with the Vikings.

NFL career statistics

Personal life
On August 30, 2019, Mullens and his wife had their first child.

Notes

External links

Minnesota Vikings bio
Southern Miss Golden Eagles bio

1995 births
Living people
Players of American football from Alabama
People from Hoover, Alabama
American football quarterbacks
Southern Miss Golden Eagles football players
San Francisco 49ers players
Philadelphia Eagles players
Cleveland Browns players
Las Vegas Raiders players
Minnesota Vikings players